Stephen John Zahursky (born September 2, 1976 in Euclid, Ohio) is a retired professional American football player who played offensive lineman for three seasons for the Cleveland Browns (1999–2000) and the Jacksonville Jaguars (2001).

Later life
After his playing career, Zahursky became a police officer, working in North Royalton, Ohio and was considered Cuyahoga County's "top OVI cop". In 2019, Zahursky was charged with felony perjury, tampering with evidence, and falsification, relating to an April 2018 OVI arrest where Zahursky's claims in court of a man's intoxication were shown to be false. Felony charges were dropped in November 2019 when Zahursky took a plea deal and pleaded guilty to a misdemeanor charge of obstructing official business; he was sentenced one year probation, ordered to pay a $50 fine, and recommended to return to his job as a police officer on restricted duty for one year.

References

1976 births
Living people
People from Euclid, Ohio
Players of American football from Ohio
American football offensive guards
American football offensive tackles
Kent State Golden Flashes football players
Cleveland Browns players
Jacksonville Jaguars players
Sportspeople from Cuyahoga County, Ohio